The Wadi Ghan Dam is a rock-fill embankment dam located on Wadi Al-Hira,  northeast of Gharyan in the Jabal al Gharbi District of Libya. Completed in 1982, the primary purpose of the dam is water supply for irrigation.

References

Ghan
Rock-filled dams
Jabal al Gharbi District
Dams completed in 1982
1982 establishments in Libya